Kəhrəmanlı (also, Kagramanly, Kakhramanly or Qaramanlı) is a village in the Yevlakh Rayon of Azerbaijan.

References 

Populated places in Yevlakh District